Herb Greenberg (born June 8, 1952 in Miami, Florida) is an American journalist.

Early life 
Greenberg graduated from the University of Miami with a bachelor's degree in journalism.

Career 
Greenberg was a New York-based financial correspondent for the Chicago Tribune after transferring from its Chicago newsroom, where he covered the food and restaurant industry. Greenberg has also worked for Crain's Chicago Business, the St. Paul Pioneer Press, Amusement Business, and the Boca Raton News.

Greenberg spent 10 years as the six-day-a-week columnist for the San Francisco Chronicle's business section. In the mid-1990s, he also had his own America Online business commentary site, Bizinsider. Also, while at the Chronicle, Greenberg spent several years as the morning business reporter for KRON-TV in San Francisco and freelanced for five years as the monthly "Against the Grain" columnist for Fortune.

He became one of the first mainstream newspaper columnists to transition to digital news in 1998, writing as a senior columnist for TheStreet for six years.

Afterward, Greenberg was a columnist and blogger for MarketWatch from 2004 until 2008. He also wrote the "Weekend Investor,"  which appeared on Sundays in The Wall Street Journal.

Greenberg then left journalism for a few years to start a stock research firm with Debbie Meritz, an analyst and accountant. The firm, GreenbergMeritz Research & Analytics, was subscription-only and targeted institutional investors, investment banks, and accounting firms.

In June 2010, Greenberg joined CNBC as a full-time senior stocks commentator.

Three year later, he rejoined TheStreet as a commentator and editor of Herb Greenberg's "Reality Check" newsletter.

In November 2014, he and forensic accountant Donn Vickrey started Pacific Square Research, a short-biased research firm.

In June 2021, he left Pacific Square to launch Herb Greenberg Research but before it got off the ground, he joined Empire Financial Research as a senior editor in October 2021. In March 2022, he launched Herb Greenberg Investment Opportunities, a subscription-based service that recommends stock choices to paid subscribers.

Investigations

While at The Chronicle, Greenberg launched an investigation into Media Vision, a maker of sound cards and multimedia kits for CDs. The former CEO and CFO both went to prison.

Among his other investigations:

Greenberg started an investigation into the software company AremisSoft, which was later sued by the Securities and Exchange Commission (SEC) for fraud around Oct. 4, 2001. According to the SEC, Its former chief executive, Roys Poyiadjis, later consented to disgorge around $200 million "of unlawful profit from his trading in AremisSoft stock -- among the largest recoveries that the SEC has obtained from an individual."

Later, he investigated A.C.L.N., a Belgian company whose ships transported cars to Africa from Europe. It was later sued by the SEC on Oct. 8, 2002 and delisted by the New York Stock Exchange. In 2004 the company agreed to disgorge around $27.6 million, which was to be returned to investors. The company has subsequently disappeared.

Then he exposed accounting questions about MBIA, the bond insurer. Much of his focus was on the controversial retroactive reinsurance transaction involving the Allegheny Health, Education and Research Foundation (AHERF), which was the focus of separate investigations by the SEC, the New York Attorney General, and the New York State Insurance Department. The company settled the case by paying $75 million in penalties and disgorgement.

SEC subpoena
In February 2006, Greenberg and other reporters were served subpoenas from the Securities and Exchange Commission (SEC) demanding records of phone and e-mail communications with sources for an investigation of which the journalists were not the target. In a rare public reprimand, SEC chairman Christopher Cox said that he was not consulted prior to the issuance of the subpoenas by the SEC's San Francisco office, stating, "[The] subpoena to a journalist which seeks to compel production of his or her notes and records of conversations with sources is highly unusual."

The subpoenas were harshly criticized by the media and by First Amendment groups. In an editorial, The Wall Street Journal said that the "SEC scolds are harassing journalists who report market-moving facts based on their daily digging." The newspaper said, "The journalists are suspected of having sources who tell them things that they then share with their readers or listeners. Where we come from this is called reporting, or providing facts to investors who can then make more informed decisions." Shortly after the subpoenas were disclosed, the SEC reversed course and said it would not enforce them. The investigation, which concerned a research firm called Gradient Analytics, was subsequently dropped.

Personal life 
Greenberg resides in San Diego.

References

External links
Herb Greenberg's Marketwatch blog.
Herb Greenberg biography at CNBC.com.
https://web.archive.org/web/20081019204024/http://www.greenbergmeritz.com/

1952 births
Living people
American columnists
American economics writers
American male journalists
Writers from Miami
Writers from San Diego
University of Miami School of Communication alumni
American broadcast news analysts
CNBC people